Macrozamia johnsonii is a species of cycad in the family Zamiaceae. It is endemic to New South Wales, Australia.

References

External links
 
 

johnsonii
Endemic flora of Australia
Flora of New South Wales
Cycadophyta of Australia
Least concern flora of Australia
Garden plants of Australia
Taxonomy articles created by Polbot